Chalford is a large village in the Frome Valley of the Cotswolds in Gloucestershire, England. At this point the valley is also called the Golden Valley.

Governance
An electoral ward in the same name exists. This ward covers a similar area to the parish but extends to the Brimscombe and Thrupp ward. The total population of the ward taken at the 2011 census was 6,509.

History 

The remains, and known sites, of many barrows indicate that the plateau area of Chalford Hill, France Lynch and Bussage has been an area of continuous settlement for probably at least 4,000 years. Stone Age flints have been found in the area as well as the remains of a Roman Villa. Several of the place names in the area are also Anglo-Saxon in origin.

The name Chalford may be derived from Calf ('Way') Ford, or possibly from the Old English , or 'Chalk', and Ford (river crossing point). There were two ancient crossings at Chalford apart from the ford from which the village was named: Stoneford, recorded from the later 12th century, was the crossing-point of a track up Cowcombe hill on the line of the later Cirencester turnpike and by 1413 another track crossed into Minchinhampton by Stephen's bridge at Valley Corner.

Chalford Hill is a recent title for the western end of the hill: Its original name was Chalford Lynch. "Lynch" (lynchet in modern English) means a cultivated terrace following the contours of a hill. Chalford Lynch and its extension France Lynch originated in the late 16th century as collections of stone cottages many built illegally on the peripheries of Bisley common as the mill expansion in the valley outstripped accommodation space in the valley. Many dwellings in France Lynch and Chalford Hill only became legitimate at the time of the parliamentary enclosures in 1869.

The settling of displaced Flemish Huguenot weavers in the 17th and 18th centuries brought quality silk and woollen cloth manufacturing to the valley. Some say that they gave their name to the neighbouring village of France Lynch. It is more likely that the name comes from a non-conformist chapel, France Meeting that was displaced from the village in the valley to the Lynches above. At this point the Golden Valley is narrow and deep so many weavers' cottages were built clinging to the sides of the hills, giving the village an Alpine air. It is sometimes still referred to as the 'Alpine village'. As the paths on the hillsides were too narrow for more conventional forms of transport donkeys were used to carry groceries and other goods to houses, this tradition continuing until as recently as the 1950s.

Chalford expanded rapidly with the opening of the Thames and Severn Canal in 1789 and the village became one of the centres for the manufacture of broadcloth and badger pelt farms. Its wealthy clothiers lived close to their mills and built many fine houses which survive to this day.

Architecture 

In common with other towns and villages in the area, buildings are generally constructed of Cotswold stone, with local fields enclosed by dry stone walling. The area is designated as an Area of Outstanding Natural Beauty and the village itself is a designated conservation area.

Chalford is noted for two fine Arts and Crafts movement churches. Christ Church (Church of England) contains work by Norman Jewson, William Simmonds, Peter Waals, Edward Barnsley, Norman Bucknell, amongst other distinguished artists and craftsmen working in the Cotswold tradition. The Church of Our Lady of the Angels (Roman Catholic), Brownshill, by W. D. Caroe (1930), contains outstanding stained glass by Douglas Strachan. France Lynch, part of the civil parish but a separate ecclesiastical parish has a splendid listed church, St John the Baptist, built by George Frederick Bodley who went on to build Washington National Cathedral in Washington DC.

 

One of the most distinctive, and most photographed, features of the village is the Round House. It was built by the Thames and Severn Canal Company as a lengthman's cottage and is one of five along the Thames and Severn Canal. (The others are at Coates, Cerney Wick, Marston Meysey and Inglesham.) A notable feature is that access is by way of steps up to the first floor as the ground floor would have originally been stabling for a horse. Apart from a relatively short break in the 1950s when it was a museum it has fulfilled its function as a private residence, which it continues to do to this day.

Directly opposite the Round House is Chalford Place, a Grade II* listed building built on the site of the original home of the de Chalkfordes who are mentioned in documents as early as 1240. The house, formerly known as the Companys Arms, is one of the earlier houses in the valley. Built as a mill owner's house it became an inn in the 19th century. It owed its name Companys Arms to the East India Company for which the mills of Chalford supplied much of its cloth. It remained an inn until the 1960s when it reverted to its former name of Chalford Place.
The house lay derelict for many years until it was recently purchased and is now being restored by the artist Damien Hirst

Surviving mills in Chalford parish
 St Mary's Mill
 Clayfields/Ballingers Mill
 Iles Mill
 Belvedere Mill
 Bliss Mills (Bliss, New, Mugmore, Spring and Wood.) Now part of the Chalford industrial estate.
 Woolings Mill (including Sevilles upper mill.)
 Smart Mill (formerly known as Stoneford, Bidmeads, Hoptons and Halliday Mill.)
 Valley or Morton's Mill

The mill race of Ashmeads Mill remains; the mill itself was demolished in the early 1900s.

Notable former mill owners' houses
 Brookside
 Belvedere Mill House
 Chalford Place
 Chestnut House (Smarts Mill House)
 Green Court
 Old Valley Inn (formerly Clothier's Arms)
 Sevilles House
 Springfield House
 St Mary's Mill House
 Vale House

Listed buildings
 Grade II*: Chalford Place, St John the Baptist, St Mary's House, Wing Cottage
 Grade II: Baptist Chapel, Church of St Michael and All Angels, Christ Church, France Congregational Church and Hall

Modern Chalford 

In February 2008, Chalford hit the headlines when a community plan to reintroduce donkeys as a way of carrying shopping up the steep, narrow hills became public.

On 5 September 2009 Chalford Community Stores allowed customers to purchase shares in the business. The store,
which has been running with the aid of a volunteer workforce since 2003, is now affiliated with the independent organisation Co-operatives UK, making the share issue possible. On 4 March 2012 the store and the donkey were featured in an episode of Countryfile. The store prospered within the local church hall but returned to the High Street in May 2014 and now thrives in the former Seventh Day Adventist Hall. This was made possible by a second community share issue which raised in excess of £50,000 alongside a bank loan and various grants.

Notable residents 

Notable residents include James Bradley, the third Astronomer Royal, who died in Chalford in 1762, and the 19th-century sculptor John Thomas. Henry Cooper lived in the village as a child, after being evacuated to Chalford during the Second World War. The artist Damien Hirst has a studio in the village. Lord Janvrin, former Private Secretary to Elizabeth II, maintains a house in the village and on his retirement was gazetted as Baron Janvrin of Chalford Hill, on 10 October 2007. The Public Relations guru Mark Borkowski lives at Oakridge.

Brownshill
The sub-village of Brownshill is home to the Monastery of Our Lady and St Bernard, a community of eight Bernardine Cistercian nuns. There is a sister community at the Monastery of Our Lady of Hyning at Warton, near Carnforth.

St Mary of the Angels is a small Roman Catholic church built at Brownshill in the 1930s with funds from two former nurses, Bertha Kessler and Katherine Hudson. The architect was W. D. Caroe, with windows by Douglas Strachan.

Golden Valley 

The valley from Chalford to Stroud, known as the Golden Valley, is one of Stroud's Five Valleys; it carries the Stroud-Swindon railway (known informally as the Golden Valley line) and the Thames and Severn Canal towards the Cotswolds.

See also 
 Aston Down airfield across the Golden Valley from Chalford

Notes

References

External links 

 Chalford Hill
 Chalford Hill - Brief History
  Stroud Voices (Chalford filter) - oral history site

Villages in Gloucestershire
Stroud District
Civil parishes in Gloucestershire